All Live and All of the Night is the second live album by English rock band the Stranglers, released on 8 February 1988 by Epic Records. The release peaked at No. 12 in the UK Albums Chart in March 1988.

Background

By 1986, the band were onto their ninth studio album, Dreamtime, and had added a horn section to the live presentation. Although there had been demand for a new live album for some time, contractual obligations to their former record label EMI had prevented them from releasing any live recordings of their earlier material until 1987, making All Live and All of the Night their first live album to be released since 1979's Live (X Cert). 

The concerts from which tracks were taken, span the period from April 1985 to August 1987. The live recording of "All Day and All of the Night" was dropped in favour of a "live" version specially recorded in the studio, as the true live recording was not considered to be up to the desired quality for this album.

Critical reception

In a retrospective review, AllMusic's Alex Ogg gave the album three stars out of five, writing, "While not as good as Live (X Cert), the Stranglers' live album it bookends, this does have some things to recommend it. First, it was recorded a decade down the line and was able to draw from a wellspring of generally excellent material. Secondly, at this stage in their career, the Stranglers remained just about relevant, and were still a robust live act." Ira Robbins of Trouser Press wrote, "Despite their recent wimpo work, onstage — banging out such classics as "London Lady," "Nice 'n' Sleazy" and "No More Heroes" with a horn section — they can convincingly revive the grungy electric power we used to know and love. ... fortunately, these concert renditions improve on the songs, providing them with a little context."

Track listing

1999 Japanese CD reissue bonus tracks

2001 CD reissue bonus tracks
The 2001 reissue omits the studio version of "All Day and All of the Night".

Recording information
Live sets recorded at: Le Zénith, Paris, 29 April 1985; Hammersmith Odeon, London, 31 March 1987; The Reading Festival, 30 August 1987.
Japanese bonus tracks recorded at: The Palais des Sports, Orléans, 28 April 1985 (tracks 14, 15); The Reading Festival, 30 August 1987 (track 16); Alexandra Palace, London, 11 August 1990 (tracks 17-19).
2001 bonus tracks recorded at: The Palais Des Sports, Orléans, 28 April 1985; St George's Hall, Bradford, 2 March 1990; Guildford Civic Hall, Guildford, 19 March 1990; Alexandra Palace, London, 11 August 1990.

Personnel
Credits adapted from the album's liner notes.

The Stranglers
Hugh Cornwell – guitar, lead and backing vocals
Jean-Jacques Burnel –  bass, lead and backing vocals
Dave Greenfield – keyboards, backing vocals
Jet Black – drums, percussion

Additional musicians
Alex Gifford - saxophone, backing vocals
Chris Lawrence - trombone, backing vocals
Jason Votier - trumpet, backing vocals
Technical
The Stranglers – production
Ted Hayton – production, mixing
Jet Black – mixing
Mick McKenna – recording engineer (The Rolling Stones Mobile, Paris)
Andy Rose – recording engineer (The Fleetwood Mobile, London)
Martin Colley – recording engineer (The BBC Mobile, Reading)
Jean Luke Epstein (Graphyk) – album sleeve 
Nik Yeomans – front and back cover photography
Malcolm Heywood – centre photo
Pennie Smith – original S.I.S. photo 
Ray Bracey – airbrushing

References

1988 live albums
The Stranglers live albums
Epic Records live albums